The religious affiliations of presidents of the United States can affect their electability, shape their stances on policy matters and their visions of society and also how they want to lead it. Speculation of Thomas Jefferson, Abraham Lincoln, and William Howard Taft being atheists was reported during election campaigns, while others, such as Jimmy Carter, used faith as a defining aspect of their campaigns and tenure to hold the office.

Almost all of the presidents can be characterized as Christian, at least by upbringing, though some were unaffiliated with any specific religious body. Mainline Protestants predominate, with Episcopalians and Presbyterians being the most prevalent. John F. Kennedy was the first Catholic president and Joe Biden, the current one, is the second. There have been at least four nontrinitarian presidents.

Formal affiliation
Most presidents have been formal members of a particular church or religious body, and a specific affiliation can be assigned to every president from James A. Garfield on. For many earlier presidents, formal church membership was forestalled until they left office, and in several cases a president never joined any church. Conversely, though every president from George Washington to John Quincy Adams can be definitely assigned membership in an Anglican or Unitarian body, the significance of these affiliations is often downplayed as unrepresentative of their true beliefs.

The pattern of religious adherence has changed dramatically over the course of United States history, so that the pattern of presidential affiliations is quite unrepresentative of modern membership numbers. For example, Episcopalians are extraordinarily well represented among the presidents compared to a current membership of about 2% of the population; this is partly because the Church of England, from which the Episcopal Church is derived, was the established church in some of the British Colonies (such as New York and Virginia) before the American Revolution. The Episcopal Church has been much larger previously, with its decline in membership occurring only in more recent decades. The first seven presidents listed as Episcopalians were all from Virginia. Unitarians are also overrepresented, reflecting the importance of those colonial churches. Conversely, Baptists are underrepresented, a reflection of their quite recent expansion in numbers; the list includes only two Catholic presidents including the current president, although they are currently the largest single denomination, and there have been no Adventist, Anabaptist, Lutheran, Eastern Orthodox, Pentecostal, or Latter Day Saint presidents.

While many presidents did not formally join a church until quite late in life, there is a genre of tales of deathbed conversions. Biographers usually doubt these, though the baptism of James K. Polk is well documented.

Personal beliefs
The inner beliefs of the presidents are much more difficult to establish than church membership. While some presidents have been relatively open about religion, many have been reticent to the point of complete obscurity. Researchers have tried to draw conclusions from patterns of churchgoing or religious references in political speeches. When explicit statements are absent, it is difficult to assess whether the presidents in question were irreligious, were unorthodox in their beliefs, or simply believed that religion was not a matter for public revelation.

On the other hand, there are several presidents who considered themselves aligned with a particular church, but who withheld from formal affiliation for a time. James Buchanan, for instance, held himself allied with the Presbyterian church, but refrained from joining it until he left office.

Some presidents changed their beliefs and affiliation at some point in their lives; synthesis of statements and membership from different periods can be misleading.

Deism and the Founding Fathers
Deism was a religious philosophy in common currency in colonial times, and some Founding Fathers (most notably Thomas Paine, who was an explicit proponent of it, and Benjamin Franklin, who spoke of it in his Autobiography) are identified more or less with this system. Thomas Jefferson became a deist in later life, and Washington, James Madison, James Monroe, and John Tyler are often identified as having some degree of deistic beliefs.

Unitarianism and Nontrinitarianism
Four presidents are affiliated with Unitarian churches, and a fifth (Jefferson) was an exponent of ideas now commonly associated with Unitarianism. Unitarians fall outside of Trinitarian Christianity, and the question arises as to the degree to which the presidents themselves held Christian precepts. The information is generally available in the statements of the presidents themselves; for example, John Quincy Adams left detailed statements of his beliefs. William Howard Taft, a Unitarian, is noted to have said in a letter to a friend, "I am interested in the spread of Christian civilization, but to go into a dogmatic discussion of creed I will not do whether I am defeated or not. ... If the American electorate is so narrow as not to elect a Unitarian, well and good. I can stand it."

Two presidents were Quakers (Herbert Hoover and Richard Nixon) and information about their religion is harder to come by. Quakerism is, by its nature, not circumscribed by doctrines, but even so it is hard to determine whether either Hoover or Nixon had much adherence even to Quaker practice. For instance, it is common among Quakers to refuse to swear oaths; however, recordings show that Nixon did swear the oath of office in the conventional manner in all cases, and while the matter is clouded for Hoover, there is newspaper and circumstantial evidence that he did likewise. While Abraham Lincoln never officially joined a church, there has been some research indicating that he may have had Quaker leanings. During his time in office, he had numerous meetings with Quakers and had investigated a supposed Quaker ancestry.

The only other president with any association with a definitely non-Trinitarian body is Dwight D. Eisenhower, whose parents moved from the River Brethren to the antecedents of the Jehovah's Witnesses. Eisenhower himself was baptized in the Presbyterian church shortly after assuming the presidency, the only president thus far to undergo such a rite while in office; and his attendance at West Point was in sharp opposition to the tenets of the groups to which his parents belonged.

Nonreligious presidents

There are some presidents for whom there is little evidence as to the importance of religion in their lives. For example, almost no evidence exists for Monroe's personal religious beliefs, though this may be the result of the destruction of most of his personal correspondence, in which religious sentiments may have been recorded. As with claims of deism, these identifications are not without controversy. No president has declared himself to be atheist.

Civic religion
St. John's Episcopal Church (built 1815–1816) just across Lafayette Square and north of the White House, is the church nearest to the White House, and its services have been attended at least once by nearly every president since James Madison (1809–1817). Another Episcopal church, Washington National Cathedral, chartered by Congress in 1893, has hosted many funeral and memorial services of presidents and other dignitaries, as well as the site of interfaith presidential prayer services after their inaugurations, and the burial place of Woodrow Wilson.

Presidential proclamations, from the earliest days, have often been laden with religious if not explicitly Christian language. In at least two cases, presidents saw fit to issue denials that they were atheists. At the same time, this was tempered, especially in early years, by a strong commitment to disestablishment. Several presidents especially stand out as exponents of this. Consideration of this has become increasingly contentious as topics such as civil rights and human sexuality have increasingly put churches at odds with each other and with the government.

List of presidents by religious affiliation

List of presidents with details on their religious affiliation
For each president, the formal affiliation at the time of his presidency is listed first, with other affiliations listed after. Further explanation follows if needed, as well as notable detail.

 George Washington – Episcopalian and Deist  
 John Adams – Unitarian
 The Adamses were originally members of the state-supported Congregational churches in New England. By 1800, most Congregationalist churches in Boston had Unitarian preachers teaching the strict unity of God, the subordinate nature of Christ, and salvation by character. Adams himself preferred Unitarian preachers, but he was opposed to Joseph Priestley's sympathies with the French Revolution, and would attend other churches if the only nearby Congregational/Unitarian one was composed of followers of Priestley.
 Adams described himself as a "church going animal" in a letter to Benjamin Rush.
 Thomas Jefferson – None specified, likely Deist 
Jefferson was raised Anglican and served as a vestryman prior to the American Revolution, but as an adult he did not hold to the tenets of this church.
 Modern Unitarians consider Jefferson's views to be very close to theirs. The Famous UUs website says:
Like many others of his time (he died just one year after the founding of institutional Unitarianism in America), Jefferson was a Unitarian in theology, though not in church membership. He never joined a Unitarian congregation: there were none near his home in Virginia during his lifetime. He regularly attended Joseph Priestley's Pennsylvania church when he was nearby, and said that Priestley's theology was his own, and there is no doubt Priestley should be identified as Unitarian. Jefferson remained a member of the Episcopal congregation near his home, but removed himself from those available to become godparents, because he was not sufficiently in agreement with the Trinitarian theology. His work, the Jefferson Bible, was Unitarian in theology ...
 In a letter to Benjamin Rush prefacing his "Syllabus of an Estimate of the Merit of the Doctrines of Jesus", Jefferson wrote:
In some of the delightful conversations with you, in the evenings of 1798–99, and which served as an anodyne to the afflictions of the crisis through which our country was then laboring, the Christian religion was sometimes our topic; and I then promised you, that one day or other, I would give you my views of it. They are the result of a life of inquiry & reflection, and very different from that anti-Christian system imputed to me by those who know nothing of my opinions. To the corruptions of Christianity I am indeed opposed; but not to the genuine precepts of Jesus himself. I am a Christian, in the only sense he wished any one to be; sincerely attached to his doctrines, in preference to all others; ascribing to himself every human excellence; & believing he never claimed any other.
In a letter to John Adams dated August 22, 1813, Jefferson named Joseph Priestley and Conyers Middleton as the inspirations for his religious beliefs, writing that:
You are right in supposing, in one of yours, that I had not read much of Priestley's Predestination, his No-soul system, or his controversy with Horsley. but I have read his Corruptions of Christianity, & Early opinions of Jesus, over and over again; and I rest on them, and on Middleton's writings, especially his letters from Rome, and to Waterland, as the basis of my own faith. these writings have never been answered, nor can be answered, by quoting historical proofs, as they have done. for these facts therefore I cling to their learning, so much superior to my own.
 James Madison – Episcopalian and Deist
 Although Madison tried to keep a low profile in regards to religion, he seemed to hold religious opinions, like many of his contemporaries, that were closer to deism or Unitarianism in theology than conventional Christianity. He was raised in the Church of England and attended Episcopal services, despite his personal disputes with the theology.
 James Monroe – Episcopalian
 Monroe was raised in a family that belonged to the Church of England when it was the state church in Virginia, and as an adult attended Episcopal churches.
 "When it comes to Monroe's ... thoughts on religion", Bliss Isely comments in his The Presidents: Men of Faith, "less is known than that of any other President." Monroe burned much of his correspondence with his wife, and no letters survive in which he discusses his religious beliefs; nor did his friends, family or associates write about his beliefs. Letters that do survive, such as ones written on the occasion of the death of his son, contain no discussion of religion.
 Some authors conclude that Monroe's writings show evidence of "deistic tendencies".
 John Quincy Adams – Unitarian
 Adams's religious views shifted over the course of his life. In college and early adulthood he preferred trinitarian theology, and from 1818 to 1848 he served as vice president of the American Bible Society. However, as he grew older his views became more typically Unitarian, though he rejected some of the views of Joseph Priestley and the Transcendentalists.
 He was a founding member of the First Unitarian Church of Washington (D.C.). However he regularly attended Presbyterian and Episcopal services as well.
 Towards the end of his life, he wrote, "I reverence God as my creator. As creator of the world. I reverence him with holy fear. I venerate Jesus Christ as my redeemer; and, as far as I can understand, the redeemer of the world. But this belief is dark and dubious."
 Andrew Jackson – Presbyterian
 He became a member of the Presbyterian Church about a year after leaving the presidency.
 Martin Van Buren – Dutch Reformed
 Van Buren is reported to have attended the Dutch Reformed church in his home town of Kinderhook, New York, and while in Washington, services at St. John's Lafayette Square.
 His funeral was held at the Reformed Dutch Church in Kinderhook with burial in a family plot at the nearby church cemetery.
 William Henry Harrison – Episcopalian
 Harrison was a vestryman of Christ Episcopal Church in Cincinnati, Ohio after resigning his military commission in 1814.
 John Tyler – Episcopalian
Although affiliated with the Episcopal church, he did not take "a denominational approach to God."  Tyler was a strong supporter of religious tolerance and separation of church and state.
 James K. Polk – Methodist
Polk came from a Presbyterian upbringing but was not baptized as a child, due to a dispute with the local Presbyterian minister in rural North Carolina. Polk's father and grandfather were Deists, and the minister refused to baptize James unless his father affirmed Christianity, which he would not do. Polk had a conversion experience at a Methodist camp meeting when he was thirty-eight, and thereafter considered himself Methodist. Nevertheless, he continued to attend Presbyterian services with his wife, though he went to the local Methodist chapel when she was ill or out of town. On his deathbed, he summoned the Rev. John B. McFerrin, who had converted him years before, to baptize him.
 Zachary Taylor – Episcopalian
 Although raised an Episcopalian and married to a devout Episcopalian, he never became a full communicant member in the church.
 Millard Fillmore – Unitarian
 Franklin Pierce – Episcopalian
 James Buchanan – Presbyterian
 Buchanan, raised a Presbyterian, attended and supported various churches throughout his life. He joined the Presbyterian Church after leaving the presidency.
 Abraham Lincoln – None specified 
 Life before the presidency
 Some believe that for much of his life, Lincoln was a Deist.
 Rev. Dr. Phineas D. Gurley, pastor of the New York Avenue Presbyterian church in Washington D.C., which Lincoln attended with his wife when he attended any church, never claimed a conversion. According to D. James Kennedy in his booklet, "What They Believed: The Faith of Washington, Jefferson, and Lincoln", "Dr. Gurley said that Lincoln had wanted to make a public profession of his faith on Easter Sunday morning. But then came Ford's Theater." (p. 59, Published by Coral Ridge Ministries, 2003) Though this is possible, we have no way of verifying the truth of the report. The chief evidence against it is that Dr. Gurley, so far as we know, never mentioned it publicly. The determination to join, if accurate, would have been extremely newsworthy. It would have been reasonable for Dr. Gurley to have mentioned it at the funeral in the White House, in which he delivered the sermon which has been preserved. The only evidence we have is an affidavit signed more than sixty years later by Mrs. Sidney I. Lauck, then a very old woman. In her affidavit signed under oath in Essex County, New Jersey, February 15, 1928, she said, "After Mr. Lincoln's death, Dr. Gurley told me that Mr. Lincoln had made all the necessary arrangements with him and the Session of the New York Avenue Presbyterian Church to be received into the membership of the said church, by confession of his faith in Christ, on the Easter Sunday following the Friday night when Mr. Lincoln was assassinated." Mrs. Lauck was, she said, about thirty years of age at the time of the assassination.
 John Remsburg, president of the American Secular Union, argued against claims of Lincoln's conversion in his book Six Historic Americans (1906). He cites several of Lincoln's close associates:
The man who stood nearest to President Lincoln at Washington – nearer than any clergyman or newspaper correspondent – was his private secretary, Col. John G. Nicolay. In a letter dated May 27, 1865, Colonel Nicolay says: "Mr. Lincoln did not, to my knowledge, in any way change his religious ideas, opinions, or beliefs from the time he left Springfield to the day of his death."
 After his assassination Mrs. Lincoln said: "Mr. Lincoln had no hope and no faith in the usual acceptance of these words." His lifelong friend and executor, Judge David Davis, affirmed the same: "He had no faith in the Christian sense of the term." His biographer, Colonel Lamon, intimately acquainted with him in Illinois, and with him during all the years that he lived in Washington, says: "Never in all that time did he let fall from his lips or his pen an expression which remotely implied the slightest faith in Jesus as the son of God and the Savior of men."
 Andrew Johnson – No formal affiliation
 He accompanied his wife Eliza McCardle Johnson to Methodist services sometimes, belonged to no church himself, and sometimes attended Catholic services—remarking favorably that there was no reserved seating.
 Ulysses S. Grant – Methodist
 Grant was never baptized into any church, though he accompanied his wife Julia Grant to Methodist services. Many sources list his religious affiliation as Methodist based on a Methodist minister's account of a deathbed conversion. He did leave a note for his wife in which he hoped to meet her again in a better world.
 In his 1875 State of the Union address, during conflicts over Catholic parochial schooling, Grant called for a constitutional amendment that would require all states to establish free public schools while "forbidding the teaching in said schools of religious, atheistic, or pagan tenets; and prohibiting the granting of any school funds or school taxes ... for the benefit ... of any religious sect or denomination." The proposed Blaine Amendment to the Constitution followed.
 Rutherford B. Hayes – Unspecified Protestant
 Hayes came from a Presbyterian family, but attended Methodist schools as a youth.
 Many sources list him as Methodist; in general, however, it is agreed that he held himself to be a Christian, but of no specific church.
In his diary entry for May 17, 1890, he states: "Writing a few words for Mohonk Negro Conference, I find myself using the word Christian. I am not a subscriber to any creed. I belong to no church. But in a sense, satisfactory to myself and believed by me to be important, I try to be a Christian, or rather I want to be a Christian and to help do Christian work."
 Hayes' wife, Lucy, was a Methodist, a temperance advocate, and deeply opposed to slavery; he generally attended church with her.
 James Garfield – Disciples of Christ
 He was baptized at age eighteen.
 Through his twenties, Garfield preached and held revival meetings, though he was never formally a minister within the church.
 Charles J. Guiteau attempted to assassinate Garfield at a sermon.
 Chester A. Arthur – Episcopalian
 His father was a Baptist preacher.
 Upon his wife's death in 1880, he commissioned a memorial window for the south transept of St. John's, Lafayette Square, visible from the White House and lighted from within at his behest.
 Grover Cleveland – Presbyterian
 Benjamin Harrison – Presbyterian
 Harrison became a church elder, and taught Sunday school.
 Grover Cleveland – Presbyterian
 William McKinley – Methodist
 Early in life, he planned to become a Methodist minister.
 James Rusling, a McKinley supporter, related a story that McKinley had addressed a church delegation and had stated that one of the objectives of the Spanish–American War was "to educate the Filipinos, and uplift and civilize and Christianize them". Recent historians have judged this account unreliable, especially in light of implausible statements Rusling made about Lincoln's religion.
 McKinley is the only president to include exclusively Christian language in his Thanksgiving Day proclamation.
 Theodore Roosevelt – Dutch Reformed
 Roosevelt always stated that he was Dutch Reformed; however, he attended Episcopal churches where there was no Reformed church nearby. (His second wife Edith was Episcopalian from birth.) As there was no Dutch Reformed church in Oyster Bay, New York, he attended Christ Church Oyster Bay when in residence there, and it was in that church that his funeral was held.
 His mother was Presbyterian and as a child he attended Presbyterian churches with her.
 William Howard Taft – Unitarian
 Before becoming president, Taft was offered the presidency of Yale University, at that time affiliated with the Congregationalist Church; Taft turned the post down, saying, "I do not believe in the divinity of Christ."
 Taft's beliefs were the subject of some controversy, and in 1908 he found it necessary to refute a rumor that he was an atheist.
 Woodrow Wilson – Presbyterian
 Wilson's father was a Presbyterian minister and professor of theology.
 Prior to being Governor of New Jersey and President of the United States, Wilson served as President of Princeton University, which was at the time affiliated with the Presbyterian Church.
 Warren G. Harding – Northern Baptist
 Calvin Coolidge – Congregationalist
 Coolidge attended Edwards Congregational Church in Northampton, Massachusetts, which was affiliated with the National Council of Congregational Churches.
 Herbert Hoover – Quaker
 As Quakers customarily do not swear oaths, it was expected that Hoover would affirm the oath of office, and most sources state that he did so. However, a Washington Post article dated February 27, 1929, stated that he planned to swear, rather than affirm, the oath.
 Franklin D. Roosevelt – Episcopalian
 Harry S. Truman – Southern Baptist
 Truman kept his religious beliefs private and alienated some Baptist leaders by doing so.
 Dwight D. Eisenhower – Presbyterian
 Eisenhower's religious upbringing is the subject of some controversy, due to the conversion of his parents to the Bible Student movement, the forerunner of the Jehovah's Witnesses, in the late 1890s. Originally, the family belonged to the River Brethren, a Mennonite sect. According to the Eisenhower Presidential Library, there is no evidence that Eisenhower participated in either the Bible Student group or the Jehovah's Witnesses, and there are records that show he attended Sunday school at a River Brethren church.
 Until he became president, Eisenhower had no formal church affiliation, a circumstance he attributed to the frequent moves demanded of an Army officer. He was baptized, confirmed, and became a communicant in the Presbyterian church in a single ceremony February 1, 1953, just 12 days after his first inauguration, the only president to undergo any of these rites while in office.
 Eisenhower was instrumental in the addition of the words "under God" to the Pledge of Allegiance in 1954 (an act highly promoted by the Knights of Columbus), and the 1956 adoption of "In God We Trust" as the motto of the US, and its 1957 introduction on paper currency. He composed a prayer for his first inauguration, began his Cabinet meetings with silent prayer, and met frequently with a wide range of religious leaders while in office.
 His presidential library includes an inter-denominational chapel in which he, his wife Mamie, and his firstborn son (who died in childhood) are buried.
 John F. Kennedy – Roman Catholic
 Kennedy was the first Catholic president. 
 Lyndon B. Johnson – Disciples of Christ
 Richard M. Nixon – Quaker
 Contrary to Quaker custom, Nixon swore the oath of office at both of his inaugurations. He also engaged in military service, contrary to the Quaker doctrine of pacifism.
 Gerald R. Ford – Episcopalian
 Jimmy Carter – Baptist
 In 2000, Carter criticized the Southern Baptist Convention, disagreeing over the role of women in society. He continued to teach Sunday school and serve as a deacon in his local Baptist church.
 Ronald Reagan – Presbyterian
 Reagan's father was Catholic, but Reagan was raised in his mother's Disciples of Christ denomination and was baptized there on September 21, 1922. Nancy and Ronald Reagan were married in the Disciples of Christ "Little Brown Church" in Studio City, California on March 4, 1952. Beginning in 1963 Reagan generally attended Presbyterian church services at Bel Air Presbyterian Church, Bel-Air, California. During his presidency he rarely attended church services, due to the inconvenience to others in the congregation. He became an official member of Bel Air Presbyterian after leaving the Presidency. Reagan stated that he considered himself a "born-again Christian".
 George H. W. Bush – Episcopalian
 Bill Clinton – Baptist
 Clinton, during his presidency, attended a Methodist church in Washington along with his wife Hillary Clinton, who is Methodist from childhood.
 George W. Bush – Methodist
 Bush was raised in the Episcopal Church but converted to Methodism upon his marriage in 1977.
 Barack Obama – Unspecified Protestant
Obama's resignation from Trinity United Church of Christ in the course of the Jeremiah Wright controversy ended more than 20 years of affiliation with the United Church of Christ. As President he attended several different Christian churches. For the most part, he has attended Methodist churches. In his childhood Obama sometimes attended Sunday school at the First Unitarian Church of Honolulu.
 Donald Trump – Unspecified Protestant
Trump said in 2015 that he attends Reformed Marble Collegiate Church in Manhattan, where he married his first wife Ivana in 1977, although the church says that he is not an "active member". He is also loosely affiliated with Lakeside Presbyterian Church in West Palm Beach, Florida, near his Mar-a-Lago estate. Trump has also had a long association with Paula White, an evangelical minister whom he has called his "personal pastor." White delivered the invocation prayer at Trump's 2017 inauguration and joined the White House staff in 2019 to work on religious outreach issues. In October 2020 Trump declared that he no longer identified as Presbyterian and was now "non-denominational."
 Joe Biden – Roman Catholic

Affiliation totals

See also

Religious affiliations of vice presidents of the United States
Religious affiliation in the United States Senate
Religious affiliation in the United States House of Representatives
List of prime ministers of Canada by religious affiliation
Religious affiliations of chancellors of Germany
Religious affiliations of prime ministers of the Netherlands

References

Further reading
 Steiner, Franklin, The Religious Beliefs of Our Presidents: From Washington to F.D.R., Prometheus Books/The Freethought Library, July 1995. 
 David L. Holmes, The Faiths of the Founding Fathers, Oxford University Press, May 2006.

External links
Adherents.com's list
Abraham Lincoln was a Deist
Six Historic Americans by John Remsburg, 1906, examines religious views of Paine, Jefferson, Washington, Franklin, Lincoln, and Grant
U.S. Library of Congress site: James Hutson article, James Madison and the Social Utility of Religion
Shapell Manuscript Foundation: "We Have a Catholic for President" U.S. Presidents' Personal Correspondence and Historical Documents
George Washington as Deist

Presidency of the United States
United States president
Religious affiliations
History of religion in the United States
 
President